Iso-Vietonen is a medium-sized lake in the Tornionjoki main catchment area. It is located in Ylitornio municipality, in the Lapland region in Finland.

See also
List of lakes in Finland

References

Lakes of Ylitornio